Aidan McAdams (born 23 March 1999) is a Scottish footballer who plays as a goalkeeper for Ayr United.

Early life
McAdams was born in Glasgow.

Club career
Having been at Celtic's academy from the age of 8, he switched to Rangers in 2017 for a large fee on a three-year contract.

He joined Annan Athletic on loan in January 2019, and made his debut for them on 2 March 2019 in a 2–1 victory over Queen's Park. He appeared in three matches for Annan Athletic.

In August 2019, McAdams joined Edinburgh City on loan until January 2020, going on to play 12 times for the club. He joined Northern Irish side Portadown on loan in January 2020. He was released by Rangers at the end of the season.

McAdams joined Greenock Morton in September 2020 on a season-long deal.

He moved to Ayr United in June 2021.

McAdams had the game of his life in Ayr United’s Historic win at Rugby Park with some heroic saves to deny Kilmarnock a second goal as Ayr went on to win the match 2-1.

International career
He has represented Scotland at under-15, under-16, under-17 and under-19 levels.

Career statistics

References

External links

1999 births
Living people
Scottish footballers
Footballers from Glasgow
Association football goalkeepers
Rangers F.C. players
Annan Athletic F.C. players
F.C. Edinburgh players
Portadown F.C. players
Greenock Morton F.C. players
Scottish Professional Football League players
Scotland youth international footballers
Ayr United F.C. players